SuperFetch is a show on Animal Planet that stars Zak George. He instructs and advises on how to train dogs to perform tricks.

Showings
Saturday from 7:00 to 7:30 PM and 7:30 to 8:00 PM (ET)
Monday through Friday from 9:00 to 9:30 AM and 9:30 to 10:00 AM (ET)

Episodes

Season one (2009)

References

TVGuide episode guide

External links

Animal Planet original programming
2009 American television series debuts
2009 American television series endings
Television shows about dogs